Delbert Merrill Shankel (August 4, 1927 – July 12, 2018) was an American microbiologist and academic administrator. He served as the interim chancellor of the University of Kansas in 1994. Shankel, a microbiologist, was educated at Walla Walla College and University of Texas (PhD in Bacteriology and Biochemistry, 1959). He started teaching at the University of Kansas' Department of Microbiology in 1959. He retired in 1996 and was named professor and chancellor emeritus
 
Shankel died on July 12, 2018.

References

1927 births
2018 deaths
Chancellors of the University of Kansas
Kansas Jayhawks athletic directors
University of Kansas faculty
University of Texas at Austin alumni
Walla Walla University alumni
People from Plainview, Nebraska